Antonio "Toni" Ucci (13 January 1922 – 16 or 19 February 2014) was an Italian actor and comedian. He appeared in 86 films between 1948 and 2000.

Born in Rome, he started his career in the revue and got his first successes in cabaret.  Ucci worked assiduously in the theater, playing comedies of all genres, including musical comedies. He had a distinguished career as a character actor in films and, since 1959, in television films and series.

Selected filmography

 Cuore (1948)
 The Emperor of Capri (1949) - Pupetto Turacciolo
 Assi alla ribalta (1954) - Barman (uncredited)
 Wild Love (1956) - Il presentatore alla Forbici d'Oro
 Peccato di castità (1956)
 La canzone del destino (1957) - Gino
 Serenate per 16 bionde (1957) - Paolo
 The Love Specialist (1957) - Carlo (uncredited)
 Non cantare... baciami! (1957)
 The Friend of the Jaguar (1959) - Gettone
 La cento chilometri (1959) - The Race Walker Searching for His Watch
 Il terrore dell'Oklahoma (1959) - Joe
 Un maledetto imbroglio (1959) - 2° Ladro (Er Patata)
 La cambiale (1959) - Ursus' Agent
 Audace colpo dei soliti ignoti (1959) - Totocalcio driver
 Simpatico mascalzone (1959) - Remo
 Il raccomandato di ferro (1959)
 Tough Guys (1960) - Beaurivage
 The Passionate Thief (1960) - L'amico di Milena
 Appuntamento a Ischia (1960) - Man at the Bar (uncredited)
 Le olimpiadi dei mariti (1960) - Waiter
 Ferragosto in bikini (1960) - Raffaele
 Psycosissimo (1961) - Augustarello (uncredited)
 The Assassin (1961) - Toni
 Pesci d'oro e bikini d'argento (1961) - Operaio
 Appuntamento in Riviera (1962) - Giacomo
 Sexy Toto (1963)
 The Two Colonels (1963) - Mazzetta
 Toto and Cleopatra (1963) - Nasone
 I terribili 7 (1963) - Romolo, Tramviere
 Corpse for the Lady (1964) - Michele
 Amore facile (1964) - Giulio (segment "Una domenica d'agosto")
 Three Nights of Love (1964) - Peppino (segment "La moglie bambina")
 Latin Lovers (1965) - Augusto (segment "La grande conquista")
 Spiaggia libera (1966) - Nando
 Mano di velluto (1966)
 Honeymoon, Italian Style (1966) - Pallino
 The Million Dollar Countdown (1967) - Theo
 Vacanze sulla Costa Smeralda (1968) - Schiavone
 I ragazzi di Bandiera Gialla (1968) - Burgunzi
 Indovina chi viene a merenda? (1969) - Paratroopers Commander
 Ninì Tirabusciò: la donna che inventò la mossa (1970) - Nando
 La ragazza del prete (1970) - Il Giaguaro
 Boccaccio (1972) - Pietro da Vinciolo
 Without Family (1972) - Male Nurse
 Il santo patrono (1972) - Brambilla
 Jus primae noctis (1972) - Guidone
 La calandria (1972) - Un Popolano
 Storia de fratelli e de cortelli (1973) - Silvio
 I racconti di Viterbury - Le più allegre storie del '300 (1973) - Nicolo
 Rugantino (1973) - Principe Niccolò Capitelli
 The Gamecock (1974) - The Friar
 4 marmittoni alle grandi manovre (1974) - Caporale Riccardini
 Sesso in testa (1974) - Lanfranco Ceccarelli
 The Last Desperate Hours (1974) - Bellyache
 Attenti... arrivano le collegiali! (1975) - Commander
 The Messiah (1975) - Herod Antipas
 Amore mio spogliati... che poi ti spiego! (1975)
 San Pasquale Baylonne protettore delle donne (1976) - Renato - the castrate
 The Cop in Blue Jeans (1976) - Lando Rossi - aka Grottaferrata
 Hit Squad (1976) - Filotto
 A Special Cop in Action (1976) - Cacace
 Batton Story (1976) - Carlo
 Il ginecologo della mutua (1977) - Nestore Arlotti
 Per amore di Poppea (1977) - Tigellino
 How to Lose a Wife and Find a Lover (1978) - Brother Francesco
 Per favore, occupati di Amelia (1981) - Il maresciallo
 Mia moglie torna a scuola (1981) - Gustavo
 Care amiche mie (1981)
 Pierino colpisce ancora (1982) - Francesco - portiere del collegio
 Più bello di così si muore (1982) - Agenore
 I camionisti (1982)
 Porca vacca (1982) - Soldato romano
 Attila flagello di Dio (1982) - Fabio Massimo
 La ragazza del metrò (1989) - Barbone
 Fiori di zucca (1990) - Giovanni
 Breath of Life (1990) - Anziano
 Captain Fracassa's Journey (1991) - The tyrant
 Lia, rispondi (1992)
 Gole ruggenti (1992) - Gianni - the director
 The Heroes (1994) - Sor Pepe
 Ponte Milvio (2000) - Aldo (final film role)

References

External links

1922 births
2014 deaths
Italian male film actors
20th-century Italian male actors
Male actors from Rome